San Babila is an underground station on Line 1 of the Milan Metro. It was opened on 1 November 1964 as part of the inaugural section of the Metro, between Sesto Marelli and Lotto.

The station is located at Piazza San Babila, in the city centre of Milan.

In the future it will also be one of the 21 stations on Line 4.

References

Line 1 (Milan Metro) stations
Railway stations opened in 1964
1964 establishments in Italy
Railway stations in Italy opened in the 20th century